Soil physics is the study of soil's physical properties and processes. It is applied to  management and prediction under natural and managed ecosystems.  Soil physics deals with the dynamics of physical soil components and their phases as solids, liquids, and gases. It draws on the principles of physics, physical chemistry, engineering, and meteorology.  Soil physics applies these principles to address practical problems of agriculture, ecology, and engineering.

Prominent soil physicists
Edgar Buckingham (1867–1940)
The theory of gas diffusion in soil and vadose zone water flow in soil.
Willard Gardner (1883-1964)
First to use porous cups and manometers for capillary potential measurements and accurately predicted the moisture distribution above a water table.
Lorenzo A. Richards (1904–1993) 
General transport of water in unsaturated soil, measurement of soil water potential using tensiometer.
John R. Philip (1927–1999)
Analytical solution to general soil water transport, Environmental Mechanics.

See also
Agrophysics
Bulk density
Capacitance probe
Frequency domain sensor
Geotechnical engineering
Irrigation
Irrigation scheduling
Neutron probe
Soil porosity
Soil thermal properties
Time domain reflectometer
Water content

Notes

 Horton, Horn, Bachmann & Peth eds. 2016: Essential Soil Physics Schweizerbart, 
 Encyclopedia of Soil Science, edts. Ward Chesworth, 2008, Uniw. of Guelph Canada, Publ. Springer,

External links

SSSA Soil Physics Division

 
Soil science